Se Puder... Dirija! is a 2013 Brazilian comedy film directed by Paulo Fontenelle and starring Luís Fernando Guimarães. It's the first Brazilian live action 3D format movie.

Cast 
 Luís Fernando Guimarães as João
 Leandro Hassum as Ednelson
 Lavínia Vlasak as Ana
 Bárbara Paz as Márcia
 Sandro Rocha
 Reynaldo Gianecchini
 Lívia de Bueno

References

External links
 

Brazilian comedy films
Brazilian 3D films
2013 3D films
2013 films
Films shot in Rio de Janeiro (city)